"Love Will" is a song written by Don Pfrimmer and Byron Gallimore, and recorded by American country music group The Forester Sisters.  It was released in February 1989 as the third single from the album Sincerely.  The song reached number 7 on the Billboard Hot Country Singles & Tracks chart.

Chart performance

Year-end charts

References

1989 singles
The Forester Sisters songs
Songs written by Don Pfrimmer
Song recordings produced by Barry Beckett
Song recordings produced by James Stroud
Warner Records singles
1989 songs
Songs written by Byron Gallimore